Reginald Leonard Clarke (4 September 1907 – 1981), sometimes known as Nobby Clarke or Reg Clarke, was an English professional footballer who made over 310 appearances as a wing half in the Football League for Exeter City. He is a member of the club's Hall of Fame.

Personal life 
In 1936, Clarke became the landlord of The Volunteer Inn pub in Ottery St Mary, which, due to his Exeter City contract stipulating that players were forbidden to be involved in the licensing trade, necessitated his departure from the club. After retiring from football, he ran The King's Arms pub in Seaton and was a club official at Seaton Town.

Honours 
Friernhay

 Devon Senior Cup: 1925–26

Individual
 Exeter City Hall of Fame

References 

1907 births
1981 deaths
Sportspeople from Exeter
English footballers
Association football wing halves
Exeter City F.C. players
Aldershot F.C. players
Torquay United F.C. wartime guest players
Leeds United F.C. wartime guest players
Clapton Orient F.C. wartime guest players
English Football League players
British publicans